The Mustersan age is a period of geologic time (48.0–42.0 Ma) within the Eocene epoch of the Paleogene, used more specifically within the South American land mammal age (SALMA) classification. It follows the Casamayoran and precedes the Divisaderan age.

Etymology 
This age is named after Lake Musters in the Golfo San Jorge Basin.

Formations

Fossils

References

Bibliography 
General
 

Sarmiento Formation
 
 
 
 
 
 

Abanico Formation
 
 
 
 
 
 

Andesitas Huancache Formation
 
 

Chota Formation
 

Geste Formation
 
 
 

Paracas Formation
 

Pozo Formation
 
 

Soncco Formation
 

Vaca Mahuida Formation
 

Ventana Formation
 
 

Yahuarango Formation
 
 
 

 
Eocene South America
Paleogene Argentina